The 1919–20 season was Newport County's fourth competitive season in the Southern League and the first in the First Division.

Season review

Results summary 
Note: Two points for a win

Fixtures and results

Southern League First Division

FA Cup

League table

External links
 Newport County football club match record: 1920

References

 Amber in the Blood: A History of Newport County. 

1919–20
English football clubs 1919–20 season
1919–20 in Welsh football